The 2021–22 UAB Blazers men's basketball team represented the University of Alabama at Birmingham during the 2021–22 NCAA Division I men's basketball season. The team was led by second-year head coach Andy Kennedy, and played their home games at the Bartow Arena in Birmingham, Alabama as a member of Conference USA. They finished the season 27–8, 14–4 in C-USA play to finish second in the West Division. As the No. 2 seed out of the West Division, they defeated Florida Atlantic, Middle Tennessee, and Louisiana Tech to win the C-USA tournament. They received the conference’s automatic bid to the NCAA tournament as the No. 12 seed in the South Region, where they lost in the first round to Houston.

Previous season
The Blazers finished the 2020–21 season 22–7, 13–5 in C-USA play to finish in second place in West Division. They defeated Rice in the quarterfinals of the C-USA tournament before losing to Western Kentucky in the semifinals. Despite winning 22 games, they did not participate in a postseason tournament.

Offseason

Departures

Incoming transfers

Recruiting class of 2021
There were no incoming recruiting class of 2021.

Roster

Schedule and results

|-
!colspan=12 style=|Exhibition

|-
!colspan=12 style=|Non-conference regular season

|-
!colspan=12 style=|Conference USA regular season

|-
!colspan=9 style=| Conference USA tournament

|-
!colspan=9 style=| NCAA tournament

Source

See also
 2021–22 UAB Blazers women's basketball team

References

UAB Blazers men's basketball seasons
UAB Blazers
UAB Blazers men's basketball
UAB Blazers men's basketball
UAB